Patton vs. Alcohol vs. Zach vs. Patton is a comedy EP by Patton Oswalt featuring Zach Galifianakis.

Track listing
Patton Vs. Alcohol Vs. Zach Vs. Patton – 27:40

References

2005 EPs
Patton Oswalt albums
Comedy EPs